Actinodoria cuprea is a species of bristle fly in the family Tachinidae.

Distribution
Trinidad and Tobago.

References

Exoristinae
Diptera of North America
Insects of Trinidad and Tobago
Taxa named by Charles Henry Tyler Townsend
Insects described in 1927